Ruth Virginia Bayton (5 February 1903) was an American-born entertainer and actress, well known in France, Germany, Spain and Argentina.

Early life

Ruth Virginia Bayton, was originally born February 5, 1903, in Tappahannock, Virginia, as the sixth child of Virginia and Hansford C. Bayton, a well known river boat captain who operated an excursion steamer in the Tidewater section along the Virginian coast. However, after 1910, Ruth was sent to Philadelphia to live with her uncle, George Bayton, a wealthy and well respected physician. Occasionally, she also stayed in Baltimore with her eldest sister, Julia Bayton-Banks, who ran a restaurant with her husband Carter Banks and their six children.

Career

Early career (1922–1925)

In the summer 1922, after finishing school and finding work as an stenographer, she was introduced to Will Vodrey, director of the Plantation Orchestra, who helped her into the chorus of the Florence Mills "Plantation Revue".  The following summer, director Lew Leslie took the revue to London as "From Dixie to Dover Street". The show did extremely well, and returned to the US to play on Broadway in 1924 as "Dixie to Broadway". In 1925, she appeared in "Tan Town Topics", with Ethel Waters as the leading star and Josephine Baker in the chorus.

Arrival in Europe (1926)

In 1926, the show arrived at Paris's Restaurant des Ambassadeurs as "Blackbirds of 1926". The show opened on May 28,  it was a sensation. Some of France's top stars attended, including Maurice Chevalier, Sacha Guitry, Yvonne Vallée, the Dolly Sisters and even Josephine Baker, who drifted in an hour late. The show moved over in July to the Théâtre des Champs-Élysées, where Josephine Baker made her debut months earlier. One night, she was approached by Henri Lartigue, who worked for the William Morris Booking Agency and organized for the show to come to France,  who offered her a lucrative contract in Berlin with a weekly salary of $200. Ruth signed the contract right then and there, agreeing to come work at the theatre in the following month, and afterward kept her own counsel. Several weeks later, Ruth departed immediately to appear at the Admiralspalast all-black revue "An Und Aus" in-between rehearsals for a much larger show at the Theatre des Westens. On August 4, "Der Zug Nach dem Westen" opened and Ruth made her appeared in a girdle of a dozen bananas. Her dancing was a large success to the German press with her extravagant jungle interpretation surrounded by a cast of 200. The revue was taken to the Apollotheater in Vienna for the winter before being rearranged into a new version with skimpier costumes and more American performers such as Ben Tyber and Louis Douglas under the name, "Wissen Sie Schon" opening in March 1927 and running for another three months. She appeared in the tableau 'Der Gott und Die Bajadere', dancing completely nude except for a silver loincloth in front of a large statue of Buddha; This time with a larger salary of $600. It's hard to say how much is truth, if any, there is in the many stories in Berlin, which state that a handsome Spanish Marquis would appear with Ruth late at night in the streets of the Friedrichstrasse and under the shadows of the Unter den Linden. Later it was claimed that this Don Juan was none other than King Alfonso XIII of Spain. Undoubtedly, much of this gossip was generated by her onstage image as the personification of unbridled sexuality, just as her counterpart, Josephine Baker. That summer, Ruth appeared in Hamburg at the Argentinean-themed Trocadero Kabarett where she was showered with flowers and the German press billed her as the 'Most Beautiful Creole on the Continent.'

Spain (1927)

Ruth soon decided it was time to move on, and after an appearance in the French resort town Biarritz to perform for a charity event at the Chateau-Basque, accompanied the Spanish actor, Valeriano Ruiz Paris, into Barcelona to open his revue, "Not-Yet" at the Teatro Cómico where she introduced her new dance, the Chotiston, which was a mixture of the Charleston and the Chotis. While in Barcelona, she was followed by an old friend, Robert Wiene, a German film director, who wanted Ruth to star on in his latest film based on the love affair of one of the most gallant European Sovereigns and the most beautiful colored dancer in Europe at the moment. Filming wrapped up by the end of September and the German crew returned to Berlin. Ruth also moved on, in October, to Valencia to appear in the El Folies-Bergere cabaret, where a painting of herself (and Josephine Baker) hung above the stage. The following month, she travelled to Madrid to star in, "Noche Loca" at the Teatro Maravillas with a white American orchestra with a salary of $800 and musical scores composed by the famous Francisco Alonso. After hours, she performed at the exclusive Maipu-Pigall's nightclub, where King Alfonso and the Primo de Rivera was noted to frequent. That winter, before she could accept Louis Douglas's offer to appear in his Black Follies revue at the Teatro Comedia, Paul Derval, director of the Folies Bergère, invited her to return to Paris for the new season, as Josephine was leaving for a world tour.

France (1928–1930)

Rehearsals for "La Grande Folie" began in February in-between her appearances at the Casanova nightclub. Meanwhile, however, she was approached by the director of the Folies-Wagram, a new musichall to be inaugurated the following month with "Revue Wagram", but Ruth turned him down. But early March, after two weeks at the Folies-Bergere, moved on to the Folies-Wagram. Avoiding Paul Derval for the next three months, she appeared with Marie Dubas dancing in the finale of the first act with tall and graceful, slim ankles, shapely well molded thighs, willowy but well developed body covered in the right proportion of blue ostrich feathers. But the rumors of her affair with the Spanish monarch began to resurface, when her German film was released in on April 12. The Spanish government offered the German producers $187,000 to destroy the film, or at least prevent it from appearing in France and Spain.  She was making conquests in high society and on her string was Germany's wealthiest bankers. She lived at the Hotel Ambassador with a fine $10,000 Hispano-Suiza driven by a chauffeur and two maids. Something she would have never accomplished in America. "Absolutely impossible," she later remarked to a visiting journalist, "I would have never been given the opportunity. I love Paris, the German people have been very kind, and so have the folks in Spain." After working at Floresco Bonbonniere, she spent the summer in Deauville, dancing at the seaside casinos and appearing at the racetracks with a new admirer Armand Rochefoucauld, 'Marquis de Deauville'. At the Concert Mayol cabaret in late November Ruth was back dancing beside Marie Dubas in, "Cochon Qui Sommeille" (The Slumbering Pig) before returning for a  quick appearance in Berlin's Barberina Kabarett, where she complained that the audience would try to grab her she danced. But the constant gloomy presence of the strongly emerging right-wing movement which was bent on purging the decadence of Weimar Germany. This was, of course, the infant Nazi movement and to them Ruth represented the both decadence and racial impurity in Germany.

In January, Ada 'Bricktop' Smith, left behind her old establishment of the Grand Duc, and opened Chez Bricktop's on the Place Pigalle. Besides Edith Wilson and Zaidee Jackson, Ruth returned from the German capital to appear. During this time, she purchased an apartment at 77 Champs-Élysées, once briefly occupied by Jo Baker herself. Soon she ran into Leon Abbey and his orchestra, and joined him on his Spanish tour to play in Seville which was hosting the Exposición Ibero-Americana. There was lots of money to be made as American tourists filled the nightclubs and theatres of the Andalucian city. There was also Barcelona's Exposició Internacional where they made an appearance on the Expo grounds. On her own however, Ruth also returned to Madrid and danced through the winter at the Maipu-Pigall's cabaret, which was known to be frequented by the Spanish monarch. On March 8, she rejoined Abbey's band in London to appear at the Deauville Restaurant. After two weeks, Leon was deported back to Paris for not obtaining his work permits. That summer, after an invitation while appearing in London, returned to Paris for the Theatre Apollo where she appeared with the dramatic singer, Damia and the American dancer Jack Forester in the new 'oriental-themed' revue "Revue Milliardaire". Once again, Ruth was chosen for the Oriental-style finale of the first act as Scheherazade in the 'Slave Merchant' sketch. After hours, she would dance the tango and mingle amongst her Spanish friends at the El Garron cabaret. After the triumphal revue closed in August, she joined Sam Wooding's band in "La Jungle Enchanté" at the Theatre Olympia before moving over to the Theatre Marigny on September 7. In December 1930, as France prepared itself for the upcoming Exposition Coloniale, Ruth returned to New York to try her luck back in America to showcase her talents that were so well publicized in Europe.

Return to United States (1931–1932)

Upon arriving, she bought a spacious apartment in the elite Sugar Hill district near Harlem, but was immediately offered to return to France to accompany Noble Sissle's Orchestra at the Restaurant des Ambassadeurs. However, the French authorities were making determined efforts to reduce the number foreign workers, including overseas musicians, in their country. Ruth got wind of a rumor that suggested that Sissle's band would only be able permitted to fulfill the second half of its booking if 50 percent of its personnel were replaced was replaced with French artists. This proved to be the truth, and Ruth immediately declined the offer, remaining in New York to open a small boutique selling precious perfumes and fur wraps, until she got bored with the idea of being a businesswoman. The idea of being away from the stage brought her back into the nightlife, appearing in some of Harlem's popular establishments like Savoy Ballroom and the Smalls Paradise in "Ethel Baird's Revue". However, her large fortune she accumulated abroad quickly faded away as she was unable to work under the same standards as she had in Europe. Early 1932, Ruth was offered a role in a floorshow at a ritzy Broadway cabaret and struck it rich again when she foiled a holdup and was awarded handsomely. By November, she was appearing in Newark, New Jersey, and renting rooms from the mother of an old friend, Crackshot Hackley. It was there she got into an argument with one of the tenants, John Burtt, white director of the Lafayette Theatre. This ended in Ruth beating him with a dog chain from one her numerous pets. The fight later involved Crackshot and his mother. After this scandal, Ruth packed her bags and informed her family she was moving to Spain (under a new stage name).

Spain (1933–1937)

They were most enthusiastic about the return of their 'Belle Creole', but the depression arrived in Europe that winter, causing the economy to fall apart and public demonstrations all across France. Despite business in Montmartre to becoming rather slow, she was found performing at the Rio-Rita Cabaret. Ruth's appearances began to become sparse and she was later departed for Deauville, entertaining at the Bar du Soleil and Casino de Deauville. 79-year old Cora E. Rollins of Chicago, who spent the weekend visiting her son-in-law, Alex Carpenter, orchestra director of the Casino, ran into Ruth, whom she had met as a child in Philadelphia. Mrs. Rollins: "Miss Bayton tried to persuade me to try my luck at the tables, but as I'm admittedly a bad loser, declined." Josephine Baker, who was also appearing at the Bar Soleil was  enamored with Ruth's German banker lover, who was visiting and tried to become close with her old buddy in order to receive an introduction. But Ruth was no longer interested in reconnecting with her old cohort and wasn't naive about Jo's motives and snubbed her old friend. Soon afterwards, she departs to Spain and takes up residence in Madrid, where she continues working under another alias until Francisco Franco staged a military coup in Spanish Morocco on 17 July 1936, which made its way to south-western Spain quickly capturing southern and northwestern Spain. The country began to split into numerous factions, which quickly turned this small coup into a civil war. Back home, her family was worried sick about her whereabouts. They hadn't heard anything from her, since her return in 1933, when she stopped writing home. During the spring of 1937, they were still unable to contact Ruth when her Uncle George died. Soon however, there were strange rumors that she escaped into South America. This was confirmed by the summer, when she wrote home finally, her letters listed having arrived from Buenos Aires. Like many Spanish artists, she had escaped to Argentina, achieving huge success, both theatrically and romantically.

Argentina and later life (1938–1950)

During the summer of 1938, she even (for some unknown reason) stood trial at the Palacio de Justicia: "By order of Mr. Investigating Judge for Criminal Matters in the capital of Argentina, Dr. Antonio L. Beiuti, is quoted calls and summons Ruth "Virginia" Bayton, so that within thirty days, computed from the first publication of this, appear to be right in the cause for false testimony that followed, failing to declare rebellious if not done." She remained in Argentina until the Spanish Civil War ended in 1939, however found it difficult to work under Franco's strict regime, and sometime after the outbreak of the German invasion of Poland, returned home to Buenos Aires, despite its pro-German attitude. Shortly after the military coup during July 1943, Ruth returned to the United States for a brief visit.

After WWII ended and shortly after Juan Perón's rise to power, Ruth left to tour war-torn Europe early 1946. That spring, she left Europe from London aboard the  back to New York, entertaining American troops and refugees along the way. She maintained a residence in New York until late 1947, afterwards relocating to Los Angeles, where she eventually passed away, at some unknown date, believed to be sometime during the late-1950s.

External links
 http://fultonhistory.com/Newspapers%2023/Pittsburgh%20PA%20Courier/Pittsburgh%20PA%20Courier%201931/Pittsburgh%20PA%20Courier%201931%20a%20-%200172.pdf
 https://palomitasenlosojos.wordpress.com/2013/01/02/ruth-bayton-o-el-fantasma-de-la-modernidad-y-el-jazz/ 
 http://hemerotecadigital.bne.es/issue.vm?id=0003387454&page=19&search=Ruth+Bayton&lang=en

References

1907 births
20th-century American actresses
Actresses from Virginia
African-American actresses
African-American female dancers
American female dancers
American dancers
African-American dancers
Music hall performers
Harlem Renaissance
Vaudeville performers
American expatriates in France
American expatriates in Spain
American expatriates in Argentina
Year of death missing
People from Tappahannock, Virginia
20th-century African-American women
20th-century African-American people